Michel Nguyễn Khắc Ngư (2 February 1909 – 10 June 2009) was a Vietnamese prelate in the Roman Catholic Church.

Ngư was born in Vạn Đồn, Indochina in 1909, and was ordained as a priest on 29 June 1934. He was appointed bishop of the newly created Diocese of Long Xuyên on 24 November 1960, and received his episcopal consecration on 22 January 1961. Ngư retired from the Diocese of Long Xuyên on 30 December 1997, at the age of 88. He died on 10 June 2009, at the age of 100. At the time of his death he was the third oldest living Roman Catholic bishop,

References

External links
"Profile at Catholic Hierarchy website (website has wrong diacritics) 
Long Xuyen website (in Vietnamese)

1909 births
2009 deaths
20th-century Roman Catholic bishops in Vietnam
Men centenarians
Participants in the Second Vatican Council
Vietnamese centenarians
Place of birth missing